Ciro Spontoni (1552-1610) was an Italian advisor to rulers, diplomat, and historian.

Biography
He traveled with the latter to Hungary and Transylvania. He also served as secretary to the Bolognese Senate. He also published a book on Metoposcopia (Metoposcopy), a mixture of astrology and phrenologic interpretation of forehead wrinkles.

Among his works are:  
 Dodici libri del governo di stato
 Ragguaglio del fatto d'arme seguito nell'Africa tra Don Sebastiano, re di Portogallo (King Sebastian of Portugal) e Matei Auda Mlucco (Muley-Abdel Melck or Abu Marwan Abd al-Malik I Saadi) (1601, Bologna)
 Azioni dei re dell'Ungheria (1602, Bologna)
 Avvertimenti della storia di Gucciardini (1608, Bergamo)
 Storia della Transilvania (1638, Venice) (see History of Transylvania)
 La metoposcopia overo Commensuratione delle linee della fronte...nuova fisonomia, un tratatto dei nei, & un altro dell'indole della persona, con molte curiosità. (1672, Andrea Rossi, Verona)

References

External links
 

1552 births
1610 deaths
16th-century Italian historians
17th-century Italian historians